Air Balloon was launched in 1784 at Hull. She traded between Hull and Petersburg until a French privateer captured her in 1797.

Career
Air Balloon first appeared in Lloyd's Register (LR) in 1784.

Fate
On 9 September 1797 the French privateer lugger Hawk, of 10 guns and six swivel guns, captured Air Balloon, Metcalf, master, some 14 leagues off the Naze. Air Balloon was on her way back to Hull from Petersburg with a cargo of iron, deals, and flax. Hawk was two days out of Dordt, and had not taken anything prior to capturing Air Balloon. The French took Metcalf and his crew, all but his mate and a boy, aboard their lugger and sailed for Calais. However a gale came up and the French could not get into Calais. They threw seven of their guns overboard and with great difficulty made it into the Texel. Her captor sent Air Balloon into Norway.

Notes and citations
Notes

Citations

1784 ships
Age of Sail merchant ships of England
Captured ships